Dripping Springs is a small unincorporated rural community in Carter County, Oklahoma, United States. The community is stretched out along State Highway 199 east of Ardmore.

References

Unincorporated communities in Carter County, Oklahoma
Unincorporated communities in Oklahoma